The MEO Rip Curl Pro Portugal 2018 was an event in the 2018 World Surf League Men's Championship Tour.

Background 
The 10th edition of the event was hosted in Peniche, Portugal from 16 to 27 October at the Supertubos beach in Peniche, (Leiria, Portugal). Italo Ferreira, who represents Brazil, is the current champion.

Brazilian football player, Neymar Jr., was one of the notable attendees of the event. He had flown from Paris to support his fellow countryman and defending Men's Championship Tour leader, Gabriel Medina. In an interview with the WSL, Medina said, "He's a really good friend. It's good to have that kind of support. He's an inspiration for me."

Italo Ferreira was crowned the champion, defeating Frenchman Joan Duru, who was competing in his first ever Championship Tour final. Ferreira's win also eliminated previous champion Gabriel Medina from the Championship Tour.

Results

Round 1

Round 2

Round 3

Round 4

Quarter finals

Semi finals

Final

References

Rip Curl Pro Portugal
2018 World Surf League
2018 in Portuguese sport
October 2018 sports events in Portugal